The President of the Senate is the presiding officer of the Australian Senate, the upper house of the Parliament of Australia.

The position is provided for by Section 17 of the Constitution of Australia. The Senate elects one of its members as president at the start of each new term, or whenever the position is vacant. This is usually—though not necessarily—a member of the party or coalition that holds the most seats in the Senate. The largest party in the Senate is not always the governing party, as government is determined by the House of Representatives. The President of the Senate and the Speaker of the House of Representatives may consequently be from different parties.

The President of the Senate's primary task is to maintain parliamentary procedure in the chamber during legislative sessions. Unlike the Speaker of the House, the President of the Senate votes as an ordinary member during general debate, and has no casting vote in the case of a tie (a casting vote would effectively give the President’s state an extra vote). The President of Senate has also various administrative and ceremonial duties, sharing responsibility for the management of Parliament House and other parliamentary facilities and services with the Speaker of the House.

Election

Constitutional provisions
Section 17 of the Constitution of Australia provides:

Process
The President is elected by the Senate in a secret ballot. The Clerk conducts the election. The Presidency has always been a partisan office and the nominee of the government party has nearly always been elected—although this cannot be guaranteed since the government of the day does not necessarily have a majority in the Senate. The President is assisted by an elected Deputy President. The traditional practice has been that the government nominates a Senator to be elected as President, and the Opposition nominates a Senator to be Deputy President. If there are no other nominations, no election is required, however the Australian Greens in 2005 and again in 2007 put forward Senator Kerry Nettle as a rival candidate when the position of President was vacant. Neither Government nor Opposition Senators supported that candidacy.

Role

Parliamentary duties
The president's principal duty is to preside over the Senate, to maintain order in the Senate, uphold the Standing Orders (rules of procedure) and protect the rights of backbench senators. The president is assisted by the Deputy President and a panel of Acting Deputy presidents, who usually preside during routine debates.

Although the president does not have the same degree of disciplinary power as the Speaker does, the Senate is not as rowdy as most Australian legislative chambers, and thus his or her disciplinary powers are seldom exercised.

Unlike the Speaker the president has a deliberative, but not a casting vote (in the event of an equality of votes, the motion fails). This is because the Senate is in theory a states' house, and depriving the president of a deliberative vote would have robbed one of the states or territories one of its senators' votes.

Administrative duties
The senate president is the chief executive of the Department of the Senate, which is one of the four parliamentary departments. The president chairs the department's budget committee and oversees its organisational structure. The president also co-administers the Department of Parliament Services (DPS) with the Speaker of the House of Representatives.

Ceremonial duties
The President of the Senate is ranked highly in the Commonwealth Table of Precedence, either before or after the Speaker of the House of Representatives depending on seniority. The president participates in the state opening of parliament, represents the parliament on overseas visits, and receives visiting delegations from other countries (and other distinguished visitors).

Salary
As with all other parliamentarians, the President of the Senate's salary is determined by the Remuneration Tribunal, an independent statutory body. As of 1 July 2019, the base salary for senators is A$211,242. The President is entitled to an additional "salary of office" comprising 75% of the base salary ($158,432), making for a total salary of $369,674 per annum and receives the various other entitlements and allowances available to senators.

List of presidents of the Senate

The position of President of the Senate has been disproportionately held by senators representing the least populous states and territories. There have been 25 presidents of the Senate since 1901. Of these 15 have come from the least populous states (Western Australia, South Australia and Tasmania) or the Australian Capital Territory, and 10 have come from the three most populous states (New South Wales, Victoria and Queensland). All senate presidents have been members of major parties, though not necessarily the governing party.

Deputy President

As well as a president, the Senate also elects a Deputy President, whose formal title is Deputy President and Chairman of Committees. Until 1981, the title was just Chairman of Committees; it was changed "to reflect more accurately the nature of the office in practice". The position is not provided for by the constitution, but instead by the Senate's standing orders – it was borrowed more or less directly from the colonial legislative councils. The deputy president's main tasks are to preside over committees of the whole and to serve as presiding officer when the President of the Senate is absent.

List
There have been 36 Deputy Presidents of the Senate, two of whom served multiple non-consecutive terms.

See also
 Clerk of the Australian Senate

References

External links
The President of the Senate, Senate Brief No 6, March 2017

Political office-holders in Australia
 
Australian Senate
Australia